Gåshamna is a bay at the southern side of Hornsund, Sørkapp Land, on Spitsbergen, Svalbard. The bay has a width of about 2 km, and is included within the Sør-Spitsbergen National Park.

References

Bays of Spitsbergen
Former populated places in Svalbard